The HyperTransport Consortium is an industry consortium responsible for specifying and promoting the computer bus technology called HyperTransport.

Organizational form
The Technical Working Group along with several Task Forces manage the HyperTransport specification and drive new developments.  A Marketing Working Group promotes the use of the technology and the consortium.

History
It was founded in 2001 by Advanced Micro Devices, Alliance Semiconductor, Apple Computer, Broadcom Corporation, Cisco Systems, NVIDIA, PMC-Sierra, Sun Microsystems, and Transmeta.  As of 2009 it has over 50 members.

Executives
As of 2009, Mike Uhler of AMD is the President of the Consortium, Mario Cavalli is the General Manager, Brian Holden of PMC-Sierra is both the Vice President and the Chair of the Technical Working Group, Deepika Sarai is the Treasurer.

External links 

 HyperTransport Consortium web site
 Technology Page
 Link Technical Specifications
 HTX and DUT Connector Specifications
 White Papers

Technology consortia
Computer buses